The Scythian religion refers to the mythology, ritual practices and beliefs of the Scythian cultures, a collection of closely related ancient Iranian peoples who inhabited Central Asia and the Pontic–Caspian steppe in Eastern Europe throughout Classical Antiquity, spoke the Scythian language (itself a member of the Eastern Iranian language family), and which included the Scythians proper, the Cimmerians, the Sarmatians, the Alans, the Sindi, the Massagetae and the Saka.

The Scythian religion is assumed to have been related to the earlier Proto-Indo-Iranian religion as well as to contemporary Eastern Iranian and Ossetian traditions, and to have influenced later Slavic, Hungarian and Turkic mythologies.

Development
The Scythian religion was of Iranian origin.

The religion was influenced by that of the populations whom the Scythians had conquered, such as the sedentary Thracian populations of the western Pontic steppe. Due to this, many of the Scythian male deities had equivalents in the pantheon of the Thracian peoples, including those living in Anatolia, and some of the names of these deities were of Thracian origin; the Scythian female deities, and especially their links with special cults and their rites and symbols, were also connected to Thracian and Anatolian culture.

During the Scythians' stay in Western Asia, their religion had also been influenced by ancient Mesopotamian and Canaanite religions.

Pantheon
He mentioned eight deities divided into three ranks, with this structure of the Scythian pantheon being typically Indo-Iranian:

 In the first rank was the head of the pantheon:
 , the Flaming One, who was the goddess of heat, fire and the hearth
 In the second rank were the binary opposites and the father and mother of the universe:
 , the Earth and Water Mother
 , the Sky Father
 The third and final rank was composed of four deities with specific characteristics:
 , the forefather of the Scythian kings
 The Scythian "Ares," the god of war
 , who might have been associated with the Sun
 , a more complex goddess who was a patron of fertility and had power over sovereignty and the priestly force

This list of the Scythian deities by Herodotus was a translation of a Scythian hymn to the gods which was chanted during sacrifices and rituals. With the omission of Thagimasadas who was worshipped only by the Royal Scythians, the Scythian pantheon was composed of seven gods, with the Sarmatian tribe of the Alans also being attested as worshipping seven deities, and traces of a similar tradition being recorded among Ossetians.

This pantheon was a reflection of the Scythian cosmology, headed by the primeval fire which was the basic essence and the source of all creation, following which came the Earth-Mother and Sky-Father who created the gods, the latter of whom were the four custodians of the four sides of the world regulating the universe. The world inhabited by humans existed between this celestial realm and the chthonic realm below the earth.

The first rank

Tabiti

The goddess Tabiti (Scythian:), whose name meant "the Burning One" or "the Flaming One,", was the goddess of the primordial fire which alone existed before the creation of the universe and was the basic essence and the source of all creation, and from her were born Api (the Earth) and Papaeus (Heaven).

Tabiti was the most venerated of all Scythian deities, but she was rarely depicted in Scythian art, and was instead represented by the fireplace, which constituted the sacral centre of any community, from the family to the tribe. As a goddess of the hearth, Tabiti was the patron of society, the state, and families, and she thus protected the family and the clan, and was a symbol of supreme authority. The king's hearth was hence connected with Tabiti, and Tabiti herself was connected with royal power.

The "hearths" of Tabiti were likely the flaming gold objects which fell from the sky in the Scythian genealogical myth and of which the king was the trustee while Tabiti herself in turn was the protector of the king and the royal hearth.

The second rank

These identifications rested upon the conceptualisation in ancient cosmologies of Earth and water as being two aspects of same the birth-giving chthonic principle, and, within Iranian tradition, the earth was a life-giving principle which was inextricably connected to water, which was held to have fertilising, nourishing, and healing properties. The name Api was also linked to a child-talk endearing word meaning "mommy," with these various connections of Api and her name painting the consistent picture of her as a primordial deity from whom was born the world's first inhabitants.

Api was the consort of Papaios, with the two of them being the children of Tapati, the primordial fire. The completion of this process of cosmogenesis created an ordered universe made up of three zones - a cosmic one, a central one, and a chthonic one - located each above the other.

As a primordial goddess who gave birth to the first inhabitants of the world, Api remained aloof from worldly affairs and did not interfere with them after the creation of the world and the establishment of the proper order.

The worship of Api by Scythian peoples is attested in Strabōn's mention that the Derbikes worshipped "Mother Earth."

Papaeus
Papaeus, whose original Scythian name is still uncertain, was the personification of Heaven, the Scythian equivalent of the Zoroastrian great god , and the consort of the Earth goddess Api, hence why he was equated by Herodotus of Halicarnassus with the Greek god Zeus.

The original Scythian form of the name of Papaeus is uncertain, and has variously been interpreted as meaning either "father," or "guardian," or "protector."

Papaios was the consort of Api, with the two of them being the children of Tapatī́, the primordial fire. The completion of this process of cosmogenesis created an ordered universe made up of three zones - a cosmic one, a central one, and a chthonic one - located each above the other.

According to Origen, the Scythians considered Papaeus to be a supreme god. Safaee argues that Darius the Great's statement in the Behistun Inscription that the Scythians did not worship Ahura Mazdā thus had no basis and was a political statement resulting from the hostilities between the Persian Empire and the Scythians.

The third rank
The deities of the third rank of the Scythian pantheon were associated to the "middle world" inhabited by humans and physical living beings, and which the Scythian cosmology, like all ancient cosmologies, conceptualised as a square plane with four sides each corresponding to one of the radical coordinates as a structural aspect of space.

Dargatavah-Skuδa was born from the union of Papaeus and a daughter of the river , and he was the divine ancestor of the Scythians.

The Scythian "Ares"
The Scythian "Ares," that is the Scythian war god equated by Herodotus with the Greek god Ares, corresponded to the Iranian deity , and might possibly have been an offspring of Tapati. The Scythian and Sarmatian "Ares" was represented by an  sword planted upwards at the top of a tall square altar made of brushwood of which three sides were vertical and the fourth was inclined to allow access to it. The Scythian "Ares" was given blood sacrifices and his representation in the form of a sword are evidence of his military function. The Scythian "Ares" was also a god of kingship, and the use of horses and of the blood and right arms of prisoners in his cult was a symbolic devotion of the swiftness of horses and the strength of men to this god who had similar powers.

The square shape of the altar of the Scythian "Ares" represented the four-sided "middle world," that is the air space, and the sword placed at its top represented the world axis which represented the vertical structure of the universe and connected its cosmic, central, and chthonic zones; the altar to the Scythian "Ares" was thus a model of the universe as conceptualised within Scythian cosmology, most and represented especially its central zone, the air space. This is also recorded in the works of the Greek author Loukianos of Samosata, who recorded that the Scythians worshipped the Wind and the Sword as gods, referring to the dual nature of the Scythian "Ares" as a god of both the Wind, which brings gives life, and the Sword, which brings death; the dual nature of this god is also visible in the  used to represent him being shaped like a phallus, thus being a deadly weapon which was also shaped in the form of a life-giving organ.

According to Tadeusz Sulimirski, this form of worship continued among the descendants of the Scythians, the Alanoi, through to the 4th century AD; this tradition may be reflected in Jordanes's assertion that Attila was able to assert his authority over the Scythians through his possession of a particular blade, referred to as the "Sword of Mars."

Legacy
The hero  from the Ossetian  might have originated from the Scythian "Ares." In the sagas, Batyraʒ appears as a brave but uncontrolled warrior living in the air space and sometimes took the form of a whirlwind, who often protected his peoples from multiple enemies, and who was made of steel and connected to his sword, which provided him with immortality so long as it remained unbroken, thus being the incarnation of Batyraʒ himself.

The Scythian god , might have been a solar deity, due to which Herodotus equated him with the Greek god Apollo).

The first term composing this name, meaning "herd" and "possessions," is a cognate of Avestan , meaning "cow pasture," and reflects the nature of "Apollo Goetosyrus" as a Hellenization of the Iranian deity Mithra ; the second element , meaning "strong" and "mighty," is the same as the Avestan element  "mighty" from the name of the goddess , and is connected to the Scythians' association of Gaiϑāsūra with the goddess Artimpasa, who had absorbed many of the traits of Arəduuī Sūrā Anāhitā.

Due to the connections of Gaiϑāsūra's and his identification with the Greek god Apollōn, he has been identified with Mithra, although this identification is largely tentative, with the multiple functions of Apollo contributing to this uncertainty.

Depictions of a solar god with a radiate head and riding a carriage pulled by two or four horses on numerous pieces of art found in Scythian burials from the 3rd century BC and later might have been representations of Gaiϑāsūra.

Artimpasa

Artimpasa , often erroneously called Argimpasa due to a scribal corruption, was a complex androgynous Scythian goddess of fertility who possessed power over sovereignty and the priestly force.

Artimpasa was a goddess of warfare, sovereignty, priestly force, fecundity, vegetation and fertility, and was the Scythian variant of the Iranian goddess /, who was a patron of fertility and marriage and a guardian of laws who represented material wealth in its various forms, including domestic animals, previous objects, and a plentiful descendance. Artimpasa had also been influenced by the Iranian goddess Anāhitā, the Assyro-Babylonian -, and by the Thracian Great Mother goddess Bendis, thus making her an altogether complex deity.

Artimpasa was thus equated by Herodotus with the Greek goddess Aphrodite Urania, who herself presided over productivity in the material world.

Thagimasidas
Thagimasadas or Thamimasidas was a god worshipped only by the tribe of the Royal Scythians. Thagimasadas was thus not a member of the pan-Scythian heptatheistic pantheon and was likely the tribal- and ancestor- deity of the Royal Scythians.

Herodotus identified Thagimasadas with the Greek god Poseidon because both Thagimasadas and Poseidon (in his form as Poseidon Hippius) were horse-tamer deities, but also because, among the Athenians who were his audience, Poseidon was identified with Erichthonius of Athens, whom the Athenians considered their mythical ancestor, similarly to how Thagimasadas was believed to be the ancestor of the Royal Scythians.

The equation of Thagimasadas with Poseidon might also be due to his possible role as a fashioner of the sky and hence was connected to sky-waters and thunderbolts just like the Greek Poseidon was.

The Scythian images of a winged horse inspired from that of the Greek Pegasus might have been connected to Thagimasadas.

Other deities

The Snake-Legged Goddess 

The Scythian deity known in modern day as the "Snake-Legged Goddess," also referred to as the "Anguipede Goddess," so called because several representations of her depict her as a goddess with snakes or tendrils as legs, was associated to the life-giving principle. The Snake-Legged Goddess was a daughter of Api, likely through a river-god, and belonged to a younger generation of deities of "lower status" who were more actively involved in human life. She appears in all variations of the Scythian genealogical myth as the Scythian fore-mother who sires the ancestor and first king of the Scythians with Dargatavah.

The Divine Twins 
The mytheme of the Divine twins, which appears across several Indo-European religions in the form of the Ancient Greek , the Vedic  and the twins from the Dacian tablets - these divine twins had in earlier Indo-European mythology been horses before later evolving into horsemen such as the Aśvins and the English Hengist and Horsa, who had horse-names. In Indo-European mythology, the divine twins were companions of the Mother-Goddess who flanked her symbol of the Tree of Life, especially in depictions of them as two horses or horsemen who stand symmetrically near a goddess or a tree.

The cult of the divine twins existed among the Scythians, with Loukianos of Samosata recording the veneration of two twin deities in a Scythian temple whom he identified with the Greek Orestes and Pylades. Their duality represented the contrast of death against fertility and resurrection, and were related to royalty and warrior society, which thus made them companions of Artimpasa, as depicted in the Karagodeuashkh plate.

Depictions of the divine twins among Scythian peoples included some Sarmatian royal brands depicting the theme of the two horsemen standing symmetrically near a tree, a small figure from a Scythian burial at Krasny Mayak depicting two men embracing one another, as well as two Greek-made bronze figurines from Scythian Neapolis depicting the Greek Dioscuri who were identified by the Scythians with the divine twins, together with a terracotta sculpture in the shape of a goddess's head were discovered in an ash altar near a wall of a temple where was worshipped a fertility goddess to whom was associated images of rams.

The divine twins' position in Scythian religion was inferior to that of the gods, likely belonging to the rank of heroes, and might possibly have been the same as the two brothers and first Scythian kings born of Dargatavah and the Snake-Legged Goddess in the genealogical myth. The Scythian divine twins, who were most likely the origin of the twin heroes who appear in the Ossetian , are another reflection of the Indo-European mytheme of the divine twins as the progenitors of royal dynasties, also found in the Roman myth of Romulus and Remus, the English Hengist and Horsa, and the Greek Dioskouroi as the originators of the dual-monarchy of Sparta.

The Solar Horseman
Among the Scythians and the Sindo-Maeotians was present the cult of a solar god depicted as a mounted deified ancestor. This deity was believed to be a fighter against evil, and was popular from the late first millennium BC to the first centuries of the Common Era on the Black Sea coast, Central Asia and Transcaucasia, and appeared in South Asia following the migrations of the Saka there.

The Mounted God of the Bosporus
By the 1st centuries AD in the Bosporus, the chariot-riding Scythian solar god Gaiϑāsūra had been syncretised with the horse-riding Persian god Mithra, imported from the southern and eastern shores of the Pontus Euxinus, to become the Most High God of the Bosporan Kingdom. This Most High God, who was depicted as a horseman, enjoyed wide popularity and was raised to the status of divine patron of the royal dynasty.

The Most High God was known in Tanais as  derived from Old Iranian , which reflects his nature as a grace- and power-giving solar god.

This scene is consistent with the depictions of the horsemen facing Artimpasa in Scythian art, and represents the communion of the Most High God with the Bosporan Aphrodite Urania evolved from Artimpasa, and is represented by the tree (similarly to Artimpasa, the Bosporan Aphrodite Urania was sometimes represented with tree-shaped limbs or head, with her palm shaped like large leaves on stele, and her head shaped like a tree top and her hands shaped like branches on a stamp), while the altar sanctifies the ceremony.

Mythology

The Genealogical Myth

The Scythian genealogical myth was a myth of the Scythian religion detailing the origin of the Scythians. This myth held an important position in the worldview of Scythian society, and was popular among both the Scythians of the northern Pontic region and the Greeks who had colonised the northern shores of the Pontus Euxinus.

Five variants of the Scythian genealogical myth have been retold by Greco-Roman authors, which traced the origin of the Scythians to the god Dargatavah and to the Snake-Legged Goddess affiliated to Artimpasa, and represented the threefold division of the universe into the Heavens, the Earth, and the Underworld, as well as the division of Scythian society into the warrior, priest, and agriculturalist classes.

Cult

Social role 
The worship of many of the Scythian deities were characteristic of the sedentary Thracian populations of Scythia, although the sword-cult of the god of war was a properly Iranian nomadic one.

Sanctuaries 
Scythian religion was largely aniconic, and the Scythians did not make statues of their deities for worship, with the one notable exception being the war-god, the Scythian "Ares." Nevertheless, the Scythians did make smaller scale images of certain of their deities for use as decorations, although Tapati, Papaeus and Api seem to have never been represented in any anthropomorphised form.

The only god to which Scythians built sanctuaries was the war-god, the Scythian "Ares," to whom a high place was made out of a pile of brushwood, of which the three sides were upright and vertical and the fourth side formed a slope on which worshippers could walk to the top of the high place, which was itself a square-shaped platform on which the god himself was ritually represented in the form of a sword placed pointing upward. The square shape of the platform might have formed a representation of Scythian religion's conceptualisation of the universe as being four-sided while the sword-idol might have been a cosmic axis which united the human and divine worlds. This tall brushwood high place was a representation of the world mountain. These brushwood high places could be found throughout all regions inhabited by the Scythians, and every year more brushwood was added to the high place to maintain its structure.

The Sarmatians similarly represented their "Ares" in the form of a sword planted upright.

A holy site of the Scythians was Hexampaeus, that is the Holy Ways, located between the Dnipro and the Southern Buh rivers, where was located a large bronze cauldron which Herodotus described as "six fingers breadth in thickness" and which could contain the volume of six hundred amphorae. According to Scythian legend, this cauldron was made when the king Ariantas ordered every one of his subjects to bring him a single arrowhead so he could know the exact number of his subjects. The great bronze cauldron at Hexampaeus was made out of the heap of arrowheads which accumulated from this census. This cauldron located at the Holy Ways was believed to be the centre of the world, and the legend of the arrowheads reflected that all Scythians had collective ownership of it.

Practices

Sun worship
Herodotus mentioned that the Massagetai worshipped only the Sun-god, to whom they sacrificed horses, which referred to the cult of the supreme Sun-god Mithra, who was associated with the worship of fire and horses. When the Persian king Cyrus the Great attacked the Massagetai, their queen Tomyris swore by the Sun to kill him if he did not return back to his kingdom.

Use of hemp
The Scythians would ritually use the vapours of the hemp plant as an intoxicant.

Clergy

The priest-king 
Among Indo-Iranian peoples, the king had a charisma which took the physical form of gold, held to be a royal metal, and therefore the king displayed his visible extraordinary powers by controlling the gold  of Tapatī́.

The  

The  were transvestites who belonged to the most powerful Scythian aristocracy and wore women's clothing as well performed women's jobs and spoke like women, and were affiliated to an orgiastic cult of the goddess Artimpasa in her form strongly influenced by Near Eastern fertility goddesses.

The  also acted as seers and performed a particular form of divination which, unlike the methods of traditional Scythian soothsayers, used linden bark.

The Bosporan 
These worshippers' associations belonged to the same institution and organised the whole citizenry of Tanais into distinct groups which each had a very strict hierarchy, and around half of their memberships was ethnically Greek while the other half was ethnically Iranian.

These male societies had been Hellenised when they were incorporated into the social structure of the Bosporan Kingdom.

The cult of the dead of the male societies was visible in the numerous  the Bosporan  built in commemoration of their dead members. And, like the Iranian male societies, the Bosporan  were divided into age classes, and required initiations so members could join an ideal community of alive and deceased warriors.

Festivals

Renewal of the high place
The Scythians would annually bring more brushwood to the high place of the Scythian "Ares" to maintain its structure. This ceremony also symbolised a recommitment and created a consciousness of the continuity of worship at the high place, and was also a reaffirmation of tribal identity.

Sacrifices to the war-god
Every year, the Scythians held a ceremony to honour their "Ares" during which they sacrificed cattle, horses and every hundredth prisoner of war to him. Libations of wine were poured over the prisoners who were to be sacrificed, following which their throats were cut over a vessel to catch their blood. This vessel was carried to the top of the brushwood high place of the god and the prisoners' blood was poured as libations on the sword functioning as the god's idol, and their right arms were severed and thrown into the sky and left wherever they fell. The use of horses and of the blood and right arms of prisoners in the cult of the Scythian "Ares" was a symbolic devotion of the swiftness of horses and the strength of men to this god of kingship who had similar powers, and the tall brushwood altar on which the blood was offered to the god was a representation of the world mountain.

No priests were required for the sacrifices to the Scythian "Ares."

Communal drinking
The Scythians held an annual ceremony where everyone who had killed at least one enemy was acknowledged by being allowed to drink from a communal bowl of wine in front of the assembled company, although it is unknown whether or not this festivity was performed at the same time as the yearly sacrifices to the Scythian "Ares."

Animal sacrifice 
According to Herodotus, animal sacrifices among the Scythians to all gods except to the Scythian "Ares" were carried out by tying a rope around the front legs of the sacrificial animal, then the offerer of the sacrifice standing behind the animal and pulling the rope to throw the animal forward, and strangling it to death using a rope tied around the animal's neck and tightened using a stick. The sacrificed animal was then cut up, its flesh was boiled in a cauldron, or, for those who did not have a cauldron, in the animal's own skin, while the bones were added to the fire on which the animal's flesh was cooked so they could be consumed following the approved ritual. Once the meat was cooked, the person who initiated the sacrifice would throw some of cooked meat and entrails into the ground as an offering for the god. This method of sacrifice was typical of the more nomadic Scythians.

The cult to Thagimasadas might have involved horse sacrifice.

Animals sacrificed to the Scythian "Ares" were horses, sheep, and goats.

Human sacrifice 
The Scythian "Arēs" was also propitiated using human sacrifice, which involved cutting the throat of one man out of every hundred prisoners and pouring his blood on the sword-idol of the god, and then cutting the sacrificed man's right arm and throwing it into the air and leaving it wherever it fell.

Customs

Royal customs

The royal divine marriage 
The signet ring of the Scythian king Scyles, whose bezel was decorated with the image of a woman seated on a throne and holding a mirror in her right hand and a sceptre in her left hand, with  engraved near the figure of the goddess, and on whose band was inscribed in Greek , represented communion with Artimpasa as guaranteeing sovereignty in Scythian religion. The image of the Artimpasa on the ring was therefore a representation of her as a granter of sovereignty, with the ring having been inherited from generation to generation of the Scythian royal dynasty as a token of royal power, and Argotas being a former Scythian king from whom his descendant Skula inherited this ring. The ring did not feature any image of the male partner of the goddess because the kings were themselves considered to be these partners, with the Scythian royal investiture having been considered both a communion between man and the goddess as well as a marital union which elevated the king to the status of spouse of the goddess and granted him power through sexual intercourse with the goddess. This was also a reflection of Levantine influence on Artimpasa, since Mesopotamian equivalents of Aphrodite Urania were sometimes represented together with the king in scenes represented sacred marriages, and the stability of royal power in Paphos was believed to be derived from intimate relations between Aphrodite, with whom the queen of Paphos was identified, and the king, who claimed descent from Aphroditē's lover Cinyras.

A similar rite of the marriage between the king and the great goddess existed among the Scythians' Thracian neighbours.

The ritual sleep 
The ritual sleep was a ceremony during which a substitute ritual king would ceremonially sleep in an open air field along with the gold  for a single night, possibly as a symbolical ritual impregnation of the earth. This substitute king would receive as much land as he could ride around in one day: this land belonged to the real king and was given to the substitute king to complete his symbolic identification with the real king, following which he would be allowed to live for one year until he would be sacrificed when the time for the next ritual sleep festival would arrive and a successor of the ritual king was chosen. This ceremony also represented the death and rebirth of the Scythian king and was conducted at the Holy Ways, where the great bronze cauldron representing the centre of the world was located.

Divination

Willow stick divination 
Traditional Scythian soothsayers used willow withies for divination. This method of divination involved placing a bundle of willow sticks on the ground, untying it, and laying out the individual sticks.

Linden bark divination 
A particular form of divination which was performed by the  used linden bark; the  performed this form of divination by splitting the linden bark and twining the strands among open fingers.

Art 

The motifs of Scythian cultures' Animal style art reflected the cosmological notion of the ever-present struggle of life which was held to be the essence of being. These motifs consisted of stags (sometimes substituted by elks, moose, and rams), depicted as noble beasts in repose whose legs are tucked underneath their bodies, and which represented Tree of Life which sustained the world which was always in tension. The other components of these motifs were snow leopard-like felines and birds of prey, which were represented competing with each other for the herbivores, thus creating an interlocking style of tension. These compositions featuring predator and prey were present throughout the Scythian cultures, from the Pontic Steppe to the Altai Mountains.

In the western regions, under Greek influence, the art of the Pontic Scythians underwent an evolution, with the majestic stags being replaced by docile deer or horses or rams, the felines' designs changing from snow leopard-like into images of lions, and the birds of prey becoming winged griffins, although the central theme of the struggle between predator and prey remained the same. This Greek-influenced Scythian animal art is visible in the lower frieze of the Golden Pectoral from Tovsta Mohyla, where two griffins attack a horse in its centre, while the rest of the frieze depicts lions and cheetahs attacking stags and pigs. The upper frieze instead represents humans interacting with their domesticated animals to counterpose the harmony of the human world with the conflict of the supernatural realm, as well as to equate the humans with the predators with respect to their relationship with the productive power of the earth.

In the eastern regions, the predator-prey motif could be found depicted on the Saka saddle covers from the Pazyryk kurgans and leather flasks, as well as tattooed on the bodies of the deceased buried in the kurgans.

Funerary customs 
The Scythians of Ciscaucasia buried their royalty with human sacrifices and burnt horse hecatombs, which were practices adopted by the Scythians from the native West Asian peoples of Transcaucasia and Mesopotamia, and which the Scythians in turn introduced into the Steppe. These customs were however not adopted by the other Scythians of the Pontic steppe.

The kurgans where were buried Scythian aristocrats were decorated on their surface with stelae consisting of large slabs of rocks whose surfaces had been carved into crude human figures in relief and which represented armed men whose dress, swords and weapons had been sculpted in detail. This tradition had already existed in the region of the Pontic Steppe since the 3rd millennium BC, and had later been adopted by the Scythians.

The rich furnishings of Scythian tombs demonstrate that Scythians devoted significant resources to ensuring the proper burial of their members, especially of nobles. This attested that the afterlife was extremely important in Scythian religion.

Sarmatians buried their priestesses with mirrors, which were symbols of feminine principle, eroticism and fertility that played an important role in the wedding rites of Iranian peoples, and were believed to be magical objects used for prophecy and shamanic rites. The Sarmatian citizens of the city of Tanais were buried along with weapons as well as with pieces of chalk and realgar which functioned as symbols of fire, while their graves were accompanied by burial constructions shaped as circular stone fences.

Due to increasing Scythian and Sarmatian cultural influence in Pantikapaion, the deceased were often depicted as mounted horsemen on murals in their funerary vaults and tombstones at the same time as the horseman became a recurring motif in Late Scythian and Sarmatian art in the first centuries of the Common Era.

Ritual cannibalism 
The Massagetai custom of eating the men of their tribe who had grown old might have reflected among Scythian peoples the presence of age classes, which were a distinguishing aspect of Iranian male societies.

See also

 Ancient Iranian religion
 Abaris the Hyperborean
 Horse sacrifice
 Issyk kurgan
 Kurgan stelae
 Ossetian religion
 Paleo-Balkanic mythology
 Scythian art

Notes

References

 
 
 
 
 
 
 
 
 
 
 
 
 
 
 
 
 
 
 
 
 
 
 
 
 
 
 

Religion and mythology
European mythology
Scythian religion
Ethnic religion
Polytheism
Cannabis and religion